Heinrich Hopfgarten, O.S.A. (died 1460) was a Roman Catholic prelate who served as Auxiliary Bishop of Mainz (1455–1460) and Titular Bishop of Rhosus (1455–1460).

Biography
Heinrich Hopfgarten was born in Erfurt, Germany and ordained a priest in the Order of Saint Augustine. On 21 Nov 1455, he was appointed during the papacy of Pope Eugene IV as Auxiliary Bishop of Mainz and Titular Bishop of Rhosus. On 13 Jul 1456, he was consecrated bishop. He served as Auxiliary Bishop of Mainz until his death on 24 Mar 1460 in  Mainz, Germany.

References

External links and additional sources
 (for Chronology of Bishops) 
 (for Chronology of Bishops)  
 (for Chronology of Bishops) 
 (for Chronology of Bishops)  

15th-century German Roman Catholic bishops
Bishops appointed by Pope Eugene IV
1460 deaths
Augustinian bishops
People from Erfurt